The Dutch Eredivisie in the 1962–63 season was contested by 16 teams. PSV Eindhoven won the championship. Last year, there were still sixteen participants, so there was only one promoted team this year.

League standings

Results

See also
 1962–63 Eerste Divisie
 1962–63 Tweede Divisie

References

 Eredivisie official website - info on all seasons 
 RSSSF

Eredivisie seasons
Netherlands
1962–63 in Dutch football